Tom Dixon, OBE (born 21 May 1959 in Sfax, Tunisia) is a self-taught British designer. He is best known as the Creative Director of the eponymous brand 'Tom Dixon', which specializes in the design of lighting, furniture and accessories.

His works have been acquired by museums across the globe, including London's Victoria and Albert Museum, the Museum of Modern Art New York and Centre Georges Pompidou, Paris, France

Career

Tom Dixon was the bass guitarist in the band Funkapolitan. In 1981 the band supported The Clash on their US Tour and appeared on Top of the Pops.  A series of motorbike accidents and a broken arm led Tom to experiment with welding and designing products in this way.   Dixon rose to prominence in the mid 1980s as “the talented untrained designer with a line in welded salvage furniture". He set up ‘Space’ as a creative think-tank and shop front for himself and other young designers. By the late 1980s, he was working for the Italian giant Cappellini for whom he designed the Iconic ‘S’ chair.

 
In the 1990s, he became a household name with ‘Jack’, his polyethylene "sitting, stacking, lighting thing" designed for his company ‘Eurolounge’. In 1993 he participated in the ″greatest exhibition of British furniture design of the 20th century″, organized by Helmut Diez in Bremerhaven, Germany. 
In 1998 Tom was appointed head of design by Habitat and later became Creative Director until 2008. He was the public face of a collective team responsible for rejuvenating the Habitat brand.

In 2002 Dixon established his brand under the name ‘Tom Dixon’. The company is based in Kings Cross, London. In 2004 Proventus, the Swedish-based private investment company, teamed up with Tom Dixon to establish Design Research, a design and product development holding company. The Tom Dixon brand launches new lighting and furniture collections bi-annually at the Milan international furniture fair and at London Design Festival. In 2012 the company launched its first accessories range at Maison et Objet, Paris. The company's products are sold internationally in 65 countries.

In 2007 Dixon launched Design Research Studio, an interior and architectural design studio. High-profile projects include Restaurant at The Royal Academy in London, Jamie Oliver’s London restaurant, Barbecoa as well as Shoreditch House. Most recently Design Research Studio announced their first ever hotel project, redesigning the iconic Thames-side Sea Containers House in collaboration with US hotel giant Morgans Hotel Group Completed summer 2014. In 2016, Dixon collaborated with Revolution Precrafted to design a prefabricated house named HOME.

His work is included in the permanent collections of New York's Museum of Modern Art and the Victoria and Albert Museum in London.

In 2017, the Tom Dixon brand launched its first textile collection Super Texture, which features three sets of cushions. Josephine Ortega, a young British textile artist, was commissioned to create two of the three cushions – Paint and Abstract. The two urban-inspired sets incorporate bright colors with varying textures. The third set of cushions, Geo, resembles layered rocks and sediment with embroidery by hand and machine.

Awards

Dixon holds Honorary Doctorates from Birmingham City University (2004)  and University of the Arts London (2007).
He was appointed an OBE for services to British Design in 2001.

Publications
 The Interior World of Tom Dixon (2008) Octopus Publishing Group. , 
 Dixonary (2013) Violette Editions.

References

External links

Tom Dixon corporate website

1959 births
British industrial designers
Living people
British furniture designers
People from Sfax
Product designers
Industrial design
Articles containing video clips
Officers of the Order of the British Empire